The Grammy Award for Best Performance by an Orchestra - for Dancing was awarded from 1959 to 1964.  The award had several minor name changes:

From 1959 to 1960 the award was known as Best Performance by a Dance Band
In 1961 it was awarded as Best Performance by a Band for Dancing
From 1962 to 1964 it has been awarded as Best Performance by an Orchestra - for Dancing

This award was presented alongside the award for Best Performance by an Orchestra or Instrumentalist with Orchestra - Primarily Not Jazz or for Dancing.

Years reflect the year in which the Grammy Awards were presented, for works released in the previous year.

Recipients

References

 
Performance by an Orchestra for Dancing
Awards established in 1959
Awards disestablished in 1964